The 2008 Brno Superbike World Championship round was the ninth round of the 2008 Superbike World Championship. It took place on the weekend of July 18–20, 2008, at the Masaryk Circuit located in Brno.

Superbike race 1 classification

Superbike race 2 classification

Supersport race classification

Brno Round
Brno Superbike World Championship round